Liam Eichenberg (born January 19, 1998) is an American football offensive tackle for the Miami Dolphins of the National Football League (NFL). He played college football at Notre Dame and was drafted by the Dolphins in the second round of the 2021 NFL Draft.

Early years
Eichenberg was born on January 19, 1998, in Cleveland, Ohio. He attended Saint Ignatius High School and played in the 2016 Under Armour All-American Game. In 2015, he committed to play college football at the University of Notre Dame.

College career
After redshirting his first year at Notre Dame in 2016, Eichenberg played in five games as a backup in 2017. He took over as the starting left tackle in 2018 and started every game for them until 2020.

Professional career

Eichenberg was selected by the Miami Dolphins in the second round (42nd overall) of the 2021 NFL Draft. Eichenberg signed his four-year rookie contract with Miami on July 27, 2021.

Eichenberg entered the 2022 season as the Dolphins starting left guard. He was placed on injured reserve on November 1, 2022. He was activated on December 27.

Personal life
Liam's younger brother, Tommy Eichenberg, is currently a starting American football linebacker for the Ohio State Buckeyes.

References

External links
Notre Dame Fighting Irish bio

1998 births
Living people
Players of American football from Cleveland
American football offensive tackles
Notre Dame Fighting Irish football players
All-American college football players
Miami Dolphins players